CPF may refer to:

Economics
Consumption–possibility frontier, a graph that shows the different quantities of two goods to which an economy has access for consumption
Cobb–Douglas production function, widely used in economics to represent the relationship of an output to inputs

Organizations
 Charoen Pokphand Foods, the agribusiness sector of the diversified agribusiness conglomerate Charoen Pokphand in Thailand
 Cherokee Preservation Foundation, a nonprofit foundation founded as part of the Tribal-State Compact amendment between the Eastern Band of Cherokee Indians (EBCI) and the State of North Carolina
 City Parochial Foundation, a charity in London, England
 Coalition for Patent Fairness, a group of companies who are lobbying for reforms to the United States patent system
 Collaborative Partnership on Forests
 Centre for People's Forestry, an NGO in Hyderabad, India

People
Charles Patrick Fitzgerald (1902–1992), British-Australian professor of East Asian studies with particular focus on China
Claus Peter Flor (born 1953), German conductor. He played the violin as a youth, and later was a conducting student with Rolf Reuter
Cristiano Pereira Figueiredo (born 1990), Portuguese footballer who plays as a goalkeeper for F.C. Vizela on loan from Sporting de Braga

Politics and government
 Canada Periodical Fund, since 2020 how the government subsidizes journalists in the daily press
 Cadastro de Pessoas Físicas, an identity number for individuals issued by the Brazilian government
 Central Provident Fund, the mandatory saving and social security plan of Singapore
 Communist Party of Finland, a communist political party in Finland. The SKP was a section of Comintern and illegal in Finland until 1944
 USC Center for the Political Future, a non-partisan center at the University of Southern California, that was established to combat uncivil political discourse and promote bipartisan, fact-based dialogue on national issues

Science and technology
Closed-cone pine forest, a plant community of coastal California and several offshore islands that consists of stands of Bishop Pines
Central place foraging, evolutionary ecology model
 Common Power Format, a file format for specifying power-saving techniques early in the design process for integrated circuits
 Corky-stemmed passion flower, common name for Passiflora suberosa, a species of passion flower that is native to the Americas
 Control Program Facility, the operating system of the IBM System/38 minicomputer

Transportation
Church Point Ferry, provides ferry services from Church Point, situated on Pittwater in the northern suburbs of Sydney, New South Wales, Australia
 Canadian Patrol Frigate, such as the Halifax-class frigate
 Ngloram Airport, Indonesia (ICAO code CPF)

Other uses
CPF Building, a high-rise skyscraper located in the central business district of Singapore
 Controlled permeability formwork, a durability enhancing formliner used in construction